The 18 foot Dinghy was used in the 1920 Summer Olympics as a double handed Olympic class. One team was present at the starting line and won the gold. Three races were scheduled, with final places decided by total points with point-for-place scoring for each race. Only one race was started with only Great Britain competing but accounts vary as to if they finished the race.

Olympic results 
Sources vary, giving the only participant the credits for the gold medal. Others rank them as AC?

See also 
 Sailing at the 1920 Summer Olympics – 18' Dinghy
 Dinghy sailing
 Dinghy racing

References

 
Dinghies
Olympic sailing classes